The Directorate-General of Customs and Indirect Taxes, commonly known as les douanes (Customs), is the customs service of the French Republic. It is responsible for levying indirect taxes, preventing smuggling, surveilling borders and investigating counterfeit money. The agency acts as a coast guard, border guard, sea rescue organisation, and customs service. In addition, since 1995, the agency has replaced the Border Police units of the National Police in carrying out immigration control at smaller border checkpoints, in particular at maritime borders and regional airports.

The Directorate-general is controlled by the Minister for the Budget, Public Accounts and the Civil Service
() at the Ministry of the Economy, Industry and Employment. It is normally known simply as "la douane", individual officers being referred to as "douaniers". Officers are routinely armed.

History 

The first French customs service was called the Ferme générale ("General Farm") and operated under the monarchy. The ferme générale was a private company which bought each year the right to collect taxes. After the Revolution, the General Farm was dismantled and the French Customs, as a State service were created. Shortly after the instauration of Empire, the Customs gained a military status. Some personnels were affected in bureaux (port or office-based staff who were tasked to apply customs measures to the goods entering and leaving France), others in brigades (mobile detachments organized and equipped to patrol the borders and arrest smugglers).

During French wars, notably the Franco-Prussian War and the First World War. the brigades were used to form marksmen units and to track enemy units trying to infiltrate French lines. During WW1, due to their knowledge of the areas and their experience in human tracking, they were part of Corps Francs (small units which were tasked to operate behind German lines to collect intelligence and perform sabotages on enemy targets).
The red stripe on their uniforms is a remaining of the decoration of one of their officers, Capitaine Cutsaert during the Napoleonic wars

The military customs service fought in the early part of the Second World War but was disbanded on June 22, 1940 after the French defeat and was never reconstituted as a military service. The most plausible reason was the downsizing of the French Military due to the 1940 armistice Nonetheless small units of customs men from customs posts in French Indochina fought against the Japanese as guerilla units until the end of the war.

The Musée national des douanes located in Bordeaux, France, presents the history of French customs.

Jurisdiction 
France has land borders with other members of the European Union Customs Union Belgium, Luxembourg, Germany, Italy, Monaco and Spain.
European Union laws prohibit systematic customs checks at any border between two members of its Customs Union. So, there is permanent customs facility at the borders with these countries. However, France has borders with non members of this Union : Switzerland, Andorra, Brazil and Suriname. At these borders are located customs facilities.
Moreover, there are many facilities inland. French Customs are allowed to search vehicles, merchandises and individuals anywhere France according to the French Customs Code, article 60.

French Customs, in addition to their main missions, are also tasked to perform immigration controls at the following airports and ports at the external border of the Schengen Area:

The French customs service carries out customs checks only at the following airports, ports and stations at the external border of the Schengen Area:

Organisation 
The customs headquarters is in Montreuil (Paris).
The agency consists of one national headquarter (Cabinet of the General Director, six sub-directorates and supporting services), national departments and local directorates :

Administration centrale, national headquarters 
 Sub-directorates (A : Human Resources, B : Budget, C : IT, D : Legal affairs, E : International Trade, F : Indirect Taxation)
 Département des statistiques et des études économiques, Statistics and Economic studies department ;
 Inspection des services (IS), internal auditing ;
 Bureau de l'information et de la communication (BIC), Office of Information and Communication ;
 DRI, Delegation for International Relations ;
 CCG, Management Control Unit ;
 General Director’s Office – General Affairs ;

Services à Compétence Nationale, national departments 
 Direction nationale garde-côtes des douanes (DNGCD) based in Le Havre, under the supervision of the Sub-directorate Réseau. It is composed of three coast guard services (services garde-côtes des douanes), in Nantes - covering the Atlantic and English Channel region, Marseille for the Mediterranean sea, and Fort-de-France for the Antilles and French Guyane seas ;
 Direction nationale du recrutement et de la formation professionnelle (DNRFP) based in Tourcoing, under the supervision of the Sub-directorate A. It is composed of the two training facilities, in Tourcoing and La Rochelle ;
 Direction nationale du renseignement et des enquêtes douanières (DNRED), which acts both as an intelligence agency and as a very serious investigations services with headquarters in Ivry, near Paris (formerly Vincennes) and substations all across France ;
 Direction nationale des statistiques et du commerce extérieur (DNSCE), formerly a statistical service, currently a datacenter and IT engineering agency, based in Toulouse,  under the supervision of the Sub-directorate C ;
 Centre informatique douanier (CID),  a datacenter and IT engineering agency based in Osny,  under the supervision of the Sub-directorate C ;
 Service national de la douane judiciaire (SNDJ), a judicial investigative service based in Ivry in the same building as the DNRED. Like the DNRED it has substations in France but not always in the same cities.
 Service commun des laboratoires (SCL), providing scientific support and legal analysis in laboratories. This service depends both of the French Customs and the Direction Générale de la Concurrence, de la Consommation et de la Répression des Fraudes ;
 Unité d'Informations Passagers – Passenger Name Record (UIP-PNR), Passenger's Information Unit, the French part of the PNR , a joint unit (with the National Police ;
 Musée National des Douanes (MND), the Museum ;
 Service d'Analyses de Risques et de Ciblages (SARC) which uses big-data to produce risk analysis to help local services to better detect frauds, under the supervision of the Sub-directorate D ;

Decentralised Services 

France is divided into 12 Directions inter-régionales (Inter-region Directorates). These 12 are divided into Directions régionales (Region Directorates).
 42 are inland directorate, which typically consists of:
Managerial, training and logistic services ;
Customs Bureaux: dealing with commerce ;
Customs Brigades: Squads dealing with surveillance ;
Two regional units, the Service Régional d'Enquêtes (SRE) Regional Service of (serious frauds) Investigations, Service Régional d'Audits (SRA) Regional Service of audits (before giving them a "trustee" status) ;
A wines unit ;

Legal Framework 
Unlike the French National Police, Municipal Polices and the French Gendarmerie, most customs officers do not gain their powers from the Code de Procédure Pénale (Code Of Criminal Procedure) but from the Code des Douanes National (National Customs Code).
They can :
 search vehicles of any kind, merchandises, people, artificial islands, installations and constructions of the continental shelf and the exclusive economic zone, commercial buildings and habitations ;
 perform drug tests on individuals ;
 order a driver to stop, and if he does not comply use all necessary means to immobilize him ;
 divert a ship to a French port ;
 seize documents and merchandises ;
 consult files of many administrations and nearly all companies which move goods or accomplish customs operations ;
 open boxes send by postal service or express fret companies ;
 perform identity checks, infiltrate criminal organizations
 investigate both nationally and internationally with foreign customs ;
 requisition qualified people ;
 take samples ;

Some of these operations require prior approval by a magistrate.

However, the personnels of the SNDJ, nicknamed Officiers de Douane Judiciaire (ODJ), can not use these powers. They gained their powers from the Code of Criminal Procedure

Personnel 

Category A (inspecteur des douanes ) is recruited from holders of a bachelor's degree; category B is recruited from holders of a high school diploma giving access to university studies; category C from holders of a vocational high school diploma.

In 2017, the ranks of Agent de constatation principal de 2nde classe and Agent de constatation de 1ère classe were merged and the rank of Agent de constatation de 2nde classe were renamed Agent de constatation. Before the Agents de constatation de 1ère class wore the same insignia than the Agent de constatation de 2nde classe except they had 3 chevrons.

Armament and equipment

Air 

In 2010 the aircraft fleet consisted of Reims-Cessna F406 maritime patrol aircraft; and Eurocopter EC-135 and Aérospatiale AS355 helicopters. Two Reims-Cessna F406s operated out of Martinique and the rest were based in metropolitan France.

From 2012 onwards eight Beechcraft King Air 350s replaced the F406s.

Maritime 

In 2010 the customs had 3 offshore patrol boats, 18 coastal patrol boats, 18 surveillance patrol boats and 5 speed boats. The boats are assigned as follows:
North sea/Channel:
1 Offshore Patrol Boat
2 Coastal Patrol Boat
1 Surveillance Patrol Boat
2 speed boats

Atlantic
1 Offshore Patrol Boat
4 Coastal Patrol Boat
3 Surveillance Patrol Boat
2 speed boats

Mediterranean
1 Offshore Patrol Boat
8 Coastal Patrol Boat
8 Surveillance Patrol Boat

Antilles/South America
4 Coastal Patrol Boat
5 Surveillance Patrol Boat

Polynesia
1 Offshore Patrol Boat
1 Speed boat

Ground forces 
As of 2008 the Customs service had 3255 vehicles (including 355 motorbikes).

Small Arms 
Customs Agents are now armed with the 9 mm SIG Sauer SP 2022 pistols as the standard issued sidearm, a French custom-tailored variant of the SIG Sauer Pro. The pistol was ordered to replace the several revolvers in service.

References 

National law enforcement agencies of France
Border guards
Customs services
Immigration services
Coast guards